Rowan Harmuth (born 4 November 1948) is a South African cricketer. He played in one List A and three first-class matches for Border in 1971/72 and 1972/73.

See also
 List of Border representative cricketers

References

External links
 

1948 births
Living people
South African cricketers
Border cricketers
Cricketers from East London, Eastern Cape